Lloyd Creek is an outer rural locality of Darwin. It was named by Fred Litchfield in 1865 after John Vereker Lloyd, who had accompanied Litchfield in exploration. Lloyd Creek was incorporated in 1869.

References

External links

Suburbs of Darwin, Northern Territory